William Lambert McGhie (born 19 January 1958) is a Scottish former professional footballer who played as a winger in the Football League for Leeds United and York City and in Danish football for B 1903. He was a Scotland youth international.

References

1958 births
Living people
Sportspeople from Lanark
Scottish footballers
Scottish expatriate footballers
Scotland youth international footballers
Association football midfielders
Leeds United F.C. players
York City F.C. players
English Football League players
Expatriate men's footballers in Denmark
Footballers from South Lanarkshire
Scottish expatriate sportspeople in Denmark